Josep Maria "Raimon" Obiols i Germà (born 5 August 1940, in Barcelona) is a Spanish politician and Member of the European Parliament for the Spanish Socialist Workers' Party (PSOE), part of the Party of European Socialists. He is a high-ranking-member of the PSOE Catalonia wing, the Socialists' Party of Catalonia (PSC). Obiols began his political career in 1977 when he was elected to the Spanish Congress of Deputies representing Barcelona Province serving until 1984, when he resigned after being elected to the Parliament of Catalunya.

References

Politicians from Barcelona
Socialists' Party of Catalonia politicians
1940 births
Living people
Members of the constituent Congress of Deputies (Spain)
Members of the 1st Congress of Deputies (Spain)
Members of the 2nd Congress of Deputies (Spain)
Members of the Parliament of Catalonia
Spanish Socialist Workers' Party MEPs
MEPs for Spain 1999–2004
MEPs for Spain 2004–2009
MEPs for Spain 2009–2014